The crab is a body position sometimes seen in basic gymnastics, yoga, and breakdancing. The body is supinated so that the back turns to the ground, and only the feet and hands make contact with the ground.

Etymology
The position's name originates from that of a crab.

Variations
Shoulders extended: the arms are held just behind the body with the shoulder joint in hyperextension.

Shoulders flexed: the arms are held alongside the head. This is also known as the gymnastic bridge.

See also 
 Bridge (exercise)
 Bridge (grappling)

References 

Human positions
ru:Мостик акробатический